Aurélio Gabriel Ulineia Buta (born 10 February 1997) is a Portuguese professional footballer who plays as a right-back for Bundesliga club Eintracht Frankfurt.

Club career
On 6 August 2016, Buta made his professional debut with Benfica B in a 2016–17 LigaPro match against Cova da Piedade. On 31 August 2017, he joined Belgian side Royal Antwerp on a season-long loan deal. For the next season, he signed a permanent three-year contract with the latter club.

On 3 June 2022, it was announced that Buta would join Bundesliga side Eintracht Frankfurt when his contract with Antwerp expired on 30 June.

Career statistics

Honours
Benfica
 UEFA Youth League runner-up: 2016–17

Antwerp
 Belgian Cup: 2019–20

Individual
 UEFA European Under-19 Championship Team of the Tournament: 2016

References

External links

Stats and profile at LPFP

1997 births
Sportspeople from Cabinda Province
Living people
Portuguese footballers
Angolan footballers
Angolan emigrants to Portugal
Association football defenders
Liga Portugal 2 players
Belgian Pro League players
Bundesliga players
S.C. Beira-Mar players
S.L. Benfica B players
Royal Antwerp F.C. players
Eintracht Frankfurt players
Portugal youth international footballers
Portuguese expatriate footballers
Expatriate footballers in Belgium
Portuguese expatriate sportspeople in Belgium
Expatriate footballers in Germany
Portuguese expatriate sportspeople in Germany